Françoise Forton (8 July 1957 – 16 January 2022) was a Brazilian actress.

Career 
The actress was the daughter of a French father and a Brazilian mother. She began her career as an actress in 1969, making a small contribution to the soap opera A Última Valsa. She then participated in an episode of the series A Grande Família in 1973, playing Tuco's girlfriend (Luiz Armando Queiroz). It gained more notoriety in television with the soap opera Fogo sobre Terra in 1974, playing the rebellious Estrada-de-Fogo. Since then, she has been in the cast of several telenovelas, always with important roles.

In 1975, she starred in Cuca Legal alongside Francisco Cuoco, Yoná Magalhães and Suely Franco. In the plot, she was one of the three women of Mário Barroso (Francisco Cuoco), Virgínia. In the same year, she was part of the cast of "Ode to ten", O Grito, where she played the activist Mariana, who was fighting for the rights of women and minorities.

The following year, 1976, she starred in Estúpido Cupido, a novel set in the 1960s. Her character, Maria Tereza, is a dreamy girl who wants to leave Albuquerque to be chosen Miss Brazil. However, her boyfriend João (Ricardo Blat), an aspiring journalist, is extremely jealous and intends to marry her, hindering in her plans. After the end of that soap opera, Françoise spent seven years away from television. In 1983 she transferred to Rede Bandeirantes where she was in the soap opera Sabor de Mel and the series Casa de Irene.

She returned to Rede Globo in 1988, participating in the soap opera Bebê a Bordo, where she played the sensual Glória, acting alongside Nicette Bruno, Patrícya Travassos and Tony Ramos.
In 1989 she played one of the villains of the great success Tieta, giving life to the cold and calculating Helena, wife of Ascânio (Reginaldo Faria). In 1990 she returned to act in another novel of prime time, in Meu Bem, Meu Mal, playing the mysterious Marcela.

In 1992, she played one of the main characters of Perigosas Peruas, the ambitious and dangerous Caroline. In 1993 she participated in Sonho Meu. In 1994 she played the frustrated nurse Clarisse in Quatro por Quatro, of Carlos Lombardi, in which she was in a romantic pair with Rômulo Arantes.
The following year, Françoise won one of the main roles of the soap opera Explode Coração, the first soap opera to be recorded at the newly opened Projac. In the plot she was the great villain Eugênia Avelar, an exquisitely beautiful and cold woman, in love with the protagonist Júlio (Edson Celulari), who did everything to conquer him.

In 1996 she integrated the cast of the novel Anjo de Mim, giving life to elegant Renata Monterrey, one of the central characters of the plot. In 1997 she returned to prime time in the successful Por Amor, of Manoel Carlos, where she played the futile Meg.

Three years later, 2000, she returned to soap operas in Uga-Uga, living as hippie Larissa Guerra. In 2001 she participated in O Clone as secretary Simone. In 2003 she was in Kubanacan as the futile Concheta. After the end of the soap opera, Françoise joined SBT, where she recorded two remakes of Mexican soap operas with important roles, Seus Olhos, in 2004, and Os Ricos Também Choram, in 2005. She then signed a contract with Rede Record where she remained until the year of 2011, during which time she participated in several soap operas and serials of the network, such as Cidadão Brasileiro, Luz do Sol and Ribeirão do Tempo.

In 2012 she returned to Rede Globo, after a season at Rede Record.

Personal life and death 
Forton was of French descent. She lived in Brasília from the age of 5 until she was 17.

She was married to the physicist Ênio Viotti for four years, and from this marriage she had her only son, Guilherme. In 2014, Françoise married theater producer Eduardo Barata.

Forton died in Rio de Janeiro on 16 January 2022, at the age of 64.

Filmography

Television

Films

References

External links 
 

1957 births
2022 deaths
Actresses from Rio de Janeiro (city)
Brazilian people of French descent
Brazilian telenovela actresses
Brazilian film actresses
Brazilian stage actresses